Legoland Deutschland Resort is a Legoland park located in Günzburg in southern Germany, roughly halfway from Munich to Stuttgart, which opened in 2002. It is 43.5 hectares (107 acres) in area, and it is one of the four most popular theme parks in Germany. The Miniland contains Lego reproductions of various German cities and rural landscapes.

History 

Legoland Deutschland was opened by the LEGO Group on May 17, 2002, in Günzburg, Germany, nine months earlier than planned. During the initial operating year, the park welcomed 1.35 million visitors. In 2005 the four Legoland parks were sold to Merlin Entertainments in a 375 million Euro deal. Although generally credited as the fourth Legoland park to open and the first in Germany, an earlier theme park (now Hansa-Park) in Sierksdorf used the Legoland branding under licence from the Lego Group from 1973 to 1976.

All of the lighting for the park was done by Gallegos Lighting Design which had done the lighting for Legoland California Resort and the sound and video production for the park was done by Edward Technologies Inc.  The park features Lego explore centers, roller coasters, water attractions and shows.  When it opened in 2002, it contained 40 attractions, 7 themed lands and was made out of 50 million Lego bricks. 10 years later, the park expanded to eight “adventure worlds” with 50 attractions and 55 million Lego bricks. Legoland Deutschland is home to the world's largest Lego building, representing Munich's  Allianz Arena and weighing 1.5 tons with dimensions of 5 meters in width and 1 meter in height. Legoland Deutschland also contains many other world records such as the largest Lego flower bed (2007), largest amount of energy generated through cycling underwater (2010), highest Lego tower (2010), largest Lego mosaic (2011), longest Lego millipede (2002), and the largest Lego brick (2005).

The park celebrated its ten-year anniversary in 2012: in that occasion,  the attraction Flying Ninjago debuted, and six scenes in Miniland based on the Lego Ninjago toy series were added.

On April 22, 2013, Merlin Entertainments Group introduced an app entitled “LEGOLAND Deutschland” available for Android and Apple devices.   The app features an interactive park map, ticket purchasing, a “Find my car” feature, and a day planner that has all of the day's events listed for visitors. 
Legoland Deutschland also introduced the electronic “express pass” which allows guests to purchase either a Standard, Premium or Gold express pass, allowing guests reserve a spot in the queue line for select attractions.  In 2013, the CEO of the park, Aksel Pedersen, announced the largest expansion in the history of Legoland Deutschland and consisted of 86,000 Lego bricks.  The park expanded by building the “Kingdom of the Pharaohs” themed land within Adventure Land which added the ride "Temple X-pedition". Additionally in 2013, the park expanded the Star Wars Miniland Model Display when they added a Yoda Lego model display. In 2014, Legoland Deutschland introduced the 5 million Lego block X-Wing Model Display which used to be in the theme park in the Hero Factory attraction hall for a limited time. Also Legoland introduced the new Königsburg hotel with 68 rooms. On March 28, 2015, Martin Kring, the then new general manager of Legoland, introduced the LEGO City Polizeistation, a walkthrough maze with special effects. The attraction was built into an existing building in the Imagination themed area. In 2016 High Five in Miniland and the new Drachenburg at Holiday Village were opened. In 2017 Ninjago World was opened based on the Lego Ninjago theme. The area includes LEGO Ninjago: The Ride and Lloyd’s Spinjitzu Spinner (opened in 2020). The new area ist the biggest investment since the opening in 2002. The following year, Legoland opened its next hotel. The Pirateninsel Hotel (Pirate Island Hotel) is based on a pirate theme and costed 26,6 million Euros. The building offers place for up to 594 guests.

On May 10, 2019, Manuela Stone, the former F&B director, took over the position as general manager from Martin Kring. In 2020, because of the COVID-19 pandemic, the park opened late on May 30 with only half of the normal capacity. On August 11, 2022, two roller coasters at the theme park collided with one another, causing more than thirty injuries.

Rides/Attractions

Roller Coasters

Lands

Entrance Area/Eingangsbereich
The entrance area is where the guests first enter the park through one of twenty entrance gates. There are three shops and one food outlet in this area, and it is also where guests can purchase an Express Pass and visit tourist information booths. At the information booths, guests can find out more information about the park. At the reception outside of the park, guests are able to check in the Holiday Village.

Miniland

Miniland contains 1:20 scale recreations of various European cities and landscapes such as Berlin, Frankfurt, Venice, Swabian Village, The Netherlands, Hamburg Harbour, the Neuschwanstein Castle and several tall buildings from around the world including Legoland's own observation tower which is also to scale.  All of the recreations were built entirely of 25 million Lego bricks.  Many of the people, animals and vehicles can be moved by hitting a button.  Miniland also housed several Star Wars models: seven scenes reproduced from the franchise, including large Yoda and Darth Vader models. These Star Wars models were removed after the 2019 season.

Lego City
Airport (Flughafen): Riders will ride in rotating Lego airplanes that move in a circular motion and riders control how high they go. 
Harbour Cruise (Hafen Rundfahrt): A boat ride where riders get to steer themselves around a monitored pond. 
Hyundai Legoland Driving School (Hyundai LEGOLAND Fahrschule): Children 7-13 get to drive around a test track and potentially receive a Legoland drivers license. This attraction has an additional fee. 
Hyundai Legoland Junior Driving School (Hyundai LEGOLAND Junior Fahschule): The Hyundai Legoland Driving School made for children under 7. This attraction has an additional fee. 
Lego Factory (LEGO Fabrik): A tour of how Lego bricks are produced as well as the manufacturing process behind Lego. 
Legoland Express: A train ride around Legoland Deutschland. 
Power Builder: Riders get on a modified industrial robot and get a wild or mild ride. The ride is a modified Kuka robot.  
Shipyard Playground (Die Werft): Children can climb and crawl around a playground designed to look like a pirate ship.

Little Asia
Flying Ninjago: This ride is based on the Lego Series Ninjago.  The attraction takes riders 22 m  in the air as the ride spins horizontally and rotates vertically back and forth. This ride was the first sky fly tower built by Gerstlauer

Knights Kingdom/Land der Ritter
Caterpillar Ride (Raupenritt): A fast spinning carrousel for any age. 
Royal Joust (Ritterturnier): Children ride on a Lego designed horse around a single track. 
Fire Dragon (Feuerdrache): It is a roller coaster with the vehicle designed as a dragon travelling through a medieval castle. 
 Dragon Hunt (Drachenjagd): A smaller roller coaster themed to mine carts.
Gold Panning (Goldsuche): Guests can pan for gold and trade in gold for a golden medallion.

Imagination

Pedal-A-Car (Tret-O-Mobil): Riders have to pedal a vehicle around a track. 
Duplo Express: A train ride made specifically for younger children. 
Duplo Playground (DUPLO Spielplatz): A playground for younger children. 
Duplo Splash Area: A splash pad for younger children. 
Lego City Police Station Maze (LEGO CITY Polizeistation): Maze with special effects. 
 Observation Tower (Aussichtsturm): A 50 meter high rotating tower giving riders a view over Legoland Deutschland.
Kids Power Tower: An attraction where riders have to pull their way up to the top of the tower using a rope and their own strength. 
Gallery of Football Stars (Gallerie der Fußballstars): A gallery of football stars made out of Lego.

Kingdom of the Pharaohs/Land der Pharaonen
Temple X-pedition (Tempel X-pedition): Riders ride on a Jeep vehicle and go on an interactive treasure hunt.
Pyramid Rallye (Pyramiden Rallye): Competitive team attraction where groups propel a hand pumped truck in a race down a street to douse a simulated building "fire" and return the truck.
Desert X-cursion (Wüsten X-kursion): Balloon ride.
Holiday Village Entrance/Exit

Adventure Land/Land der Abenteuer
Jungle X-pedition (Dschungel X-pedition): A log ride for guests of all ages ending in a 12-meter drop over a waterfall. 
Canoe X-pedition (Kanu X-pedition): Younger children can ride a small canoe around a track of water.  
Safari Tour: Riders ride on a track and take a tour of 90 Lego created animal displays. 
Adventure Playground (Abenteuer Spielplatz): Built out of wood and offers obstacles for children to climb, crawl and swing from.

Pirate Land/Land der Piraten
Captain Nick's Splash Battle (Käpt'n Nicks Piratenschlacht): A boat ride where riders have to shoot various targets using a water gun. 
Pirates School (Piratenschule): A swinging Pirate ship ride. 
Pirates’ Playground (Piratenspielplatz): A climbing obstacle course designed for younger children.

Lego X-treme

Legoland Atlantis by Sea Life: Indoor aquarium containing over 2,000 fish and a million Lego bricks. 
Stepping Tones: A fountain decorated with musical instruments made out of Lego bricks. 
Water Works (Wasserspielplatz): Splash pad with jets of water shooting from the ground. 
Wave Racers (Wellenreiter): Riders ride on a vehicle going over waves and jets of water. 
The Great Lego Race (Das Große LEGO Rennen): An 18 meter high wild mouse roller coaster.
Lego Mindstorms Center (LEGO Akademie): An educational workshop using Lego. This attraction has an additional fee. 
Techno Tea Cup (Techno Schleuder): A Teacups ride designed to look like it was made out of Lego. 
Drive Your Monster Truck: Guests can steer a remote controlled monster truck around an obstacle course. This attraction has an additional fee.

Lego Ninjago World 

 Lego Ninjago The Ride: Interactive 4-D Ride
 Lloyd's Spinjittzu Spinner: Heege Loopster

Legoland Holiday Village

In 2008, Legoland opened the first ever Legoland Holiday Village directly across from the Legoland Deutschland theme park.  Holiday Village is an 11-hectare village with 72 holiday houses, 4 hotels, 39 camping barrels and a campsite.

Accommodations 
Legoland Deutschland Resort offers the following accommodations at Legoland Holiday Village:

 Pirate Island Hotel (142 rooms)
 Castles 
 King's Castle (68 rooms)
 Dragon's Castle (34 rooms) 
 Knight's Castle  (34 rooms)
 Themed Houses (72 rooms)
 Camping Barrels (39 rooms)
 Campsite

Restaurants & Shopping 

 Pirates Tavern Restaurant & Smugglers' Bar (Family-Style dinner)
 The Round Table Restaurant & King's Tavern 
 Jungle Buffet Restaurant (all you can eat buffet)
 Steak House Restaurant 
 Holiday Village Shop (Lego shop)

Attractions 

 Pirate Golf (12 hole miniature golf course)
 Bowling Center
 High Ropes Course (six different courses with 41 components)
 Themed Playgrounds
 Hot Air Ballon ride

Awards
In 2011 and 2012, Legoland Deutschland won the Parkscout Award of "Germany's Most Child-Friendly Theme Park".  In 2012/2013, Legoland Deutschland won another Parkscout Award for the "Best Family Amusement park". Additionally in 2013, Legoland Deutschland received the Tripadvisor Travellers' Choice 2013 Award.

See also
 Lost Kingdom Adventure

References

External links

Official site
Official holidays site

Legoland
Amusement parks in Germany
2002 establishments in Germany
Buildings and structures in Günzburg (district)
Tourist attractions in Bavaria
Amusement parks opened in 2002

de:Legoland#Legoland Deutschland